Indonesia Comic Con is a comic-based convention held annually in Jakarta. Organized by Reed Panorama Exhibitions, the event was started in 2015.

2015
The first edition of the convention was held from 14–15 November 2015. Comic artist David Mack, Japanese actor Kenji Ohba and Italian artist Simone Legno were special guests at the event. 160 exhibitors from six countries had opened counters to entertain fans and sell merchandise.

2016
The second edition of the comic con was held from 1–2 October 2016. Actress Brianna Hildebrand, comic artists Alex Milne and Andy Price along with several other illustrators were present at the event. Exhibitors from countries like Canada, Italy, Japan, Malaysia, Singapore, Thailand, the US and Indonesia participated in the event. Cosplay events were held by Lego and Flabslab, while toy outlets like XM Studios exhibited fan merchandise. Several new fan zones were opened for the second edition.

2017
Actors Jason David Frank and Daniel Logan were guests for the third edition of the comic con, which was held from 28–29 October 2017. Star Wars lightsaber performances, the Walking Dead Escape Room and the Star Trek booth were some entertainment zones opened for fans.

2018
This was held on 27–28 October 2018.

References

Comics conventions
Recurring events established in 2015
Indonesian comics